Gogola is a Slavic surname. Individuals with this surname include:

Gogola may also refer to:

 Gogolá, former enclave of Diu, Portuguese India